Zavala is a Basque surname, also written as Zabala, which is the correct spelling in Basque. The variant Zavala is much more common in South America than in Europe. Notable people with the surname include:

Zavala (producer), American record producer
Aaron Zavala (born 2000), an American baseball outfielder and third baseman
Adina Emilia de Zavala (1861–1955), American teacher, historian and preservationist
África Zavala (born 1985), Mexican actress
Alejandra Zavala (born 1984), Mexican sport shooter
Alfredo de Zavala y Lafora (1893–1995), Spanish lawyer, Governor of the Bank of Spain, Minister of Finance
America Vera Zavala (born 1976), Swedish politician and political writer
Ana Rubio Zavala (born 1993), Spanish Paralympic swimmer
Andrés Allamand Zavala (born 1956), Chilean politician
Aremi Fuentes Zavala (born 1993), Mexican weightlifter
Beatriz Zavala (born 1957), Mexican politician
Boby Zavala (born 1991), Mexican professional wrestler
Carlos Zavala (born 1969), Mexican-American footballer
Cedric Bixler-Zavala (born 1974), American musician
Consuelo Zavala (1874–1956), Mexican feminist teacher
Cristián Zavala (born 1999), Chilean footballer
Dani Zavala (born 1990), American-born Guamanian footballer
Domingo Maza Zavala (1922–2010), Venezuelan economist
Eddie Zavála Vázquez, Puerto Rican politician
Eulogio Gillow y Zavala (1841–1922), Mexican Roman Catholic archbishop
Fernando Zavala (born 1971), Peruvian politician
Gabino Zavala (born 1951), U.S. Catholic priest, former auxiliary bishop of Los Angeles
Gabriel Zavala (died 2021), Mexican-born mariachi player and teacher
Gabriela Teissier Zavala, Mexican journalist
Gabriela Zavala (born 1985), Honduran beauty queen
Guillermo Zavala (born 1958), Mexican swimmer
Hernán Lara Zavala (born 1946), Mexican novelist and literary critic
Iris M. Zavala (1936–2020), Puerto Rican author
Isidro Camarillo Zavala (born 1951), Mexican politician
Jaime Galarza Zavala (born 1930), Ecuadorian writer and politician
Javier López Zavala (born 1969), Mexican politician
Jesús Zavala (actor) (born 1991), Mexican actor and singer
Jesús Eduardo Zavala (born 1987), Mexican footballer
Jimmy Zavala (born 1955), American musician
Joaquín Zavala (1835–1906), President of Nicaragua
José María Zavala Castella (1924–1992), Spanish politician
Jorge Zavala (1921–2014), Ecuadorian politician
José Víctor Zavala (1815–1886), Guatemalan Field Marshal 
Juan de Zavala (1804–1879), Spanish noble and politician
Lauro Zavala (born 1954), Mexican literary theorist
Lorenzo de Zavala (1788–1836), Mexican politician
Margarita Zavala (born 1967), wife of Mexican President Felipe Calderón and First Lady of Mexico
Maria Elena Zavala (born 1950), American plant biologist
María Guadalupe García Zavala (1878–1963), Mexican Roman Catholic religious sister 
María Zavala Valladares (born 1956), Peruvian politician, lawyer and judge
Miguel Ángel Zavala (born 1961), Mexican diver
Miguel Ángel Zavala Ortiz (1905–1982), Argentinian lawyer and diplomat
Miguel García Granados Zavala (1809–1878), President of Guatemala
Patricia Zavala (born 1985), Venezuelan model and television host
Patricio Alberto Chávez Závala (born 1967), Ecuadorian engineer and diplomat
Pedro José de Zavala, 7th Marquess of Valleumbroso (1779–1850), Spanish-Peruvian nobleman
Raúl Covarrubias Zavala (born 1965), Mexican politician
Rubén Alfredo Torres Zavala (born 1968), Mexican politician
Seby Zavala (born 1993), American baseball catcher
Silvio Zavala (1909–2014), Mexican historian
Tito Zavala (born 1954), Chilean Anglican bishop
Victor Pereyra-Zavala (born 1999), American footballer

See also

Savalas, a surname of Greek origin

Basque-language surnames